The Art Gallery of Western Australia (AGWA) is a public art gallery that is part of the Perth Cultural Centre, in Perth. It is located near the Western Australian Museum and State Library of Western Australia and is supported and managed by the Department of Local Government, Sport and Cultural Industries of the Government of Western Australia. The current gallery main building opened in 1979. It is linked to the old court house – The Centenary Galleries.

History
The Art Gallery was originally housed in the Jubilee Building with the State Museum and Library. The Jubilee Building, which was intended to be a public library only, was to be opened in honour of Queen Victoria's Golden Jubilee in 1887, but instead, only the first stone for the foundation was laid. The foundation stone was laid for the Art Gallery in July 1901 by the Duke of Cornwall and York, shortly after the federation of Australia.

Several notable individuals were involved with the development of the Jubilee Building and Art Gallery, including John Winthrop Hackett, James Battye, Ludwig Glauert, George Pitt Morison and George Temple-Poole. Sir James Dromgole Linton recommended purchases for the State Art Collection.

The Art Gallery Administration Building is housed in the former Police Quarters, designed by architect Hillson Beasley, who also designed Government House. It was built during the economic boom created by the 1890s Kalgoorlie gold rush. The Administration Building moved into the Police Quarters in the 1970s during the nickel mining boom.

The Main Gallery Building was built in 1977, and was also spurred by the mining boom. Western Australia was also placing more importance on cultural institutions, and the government was inspired by the upcoming 150th anniversary of federation in 1979. Construction of the Alexander Library began in the same period.

The architect of the main gallery building was Charles Sierakowski from the Public Works Department, who worked with engineer Philip Nadebaum and  architectural company, Summerhayes and Associates.It was designed in the Bauhaus method with a Brutalist exterior, which was popular in European design. The slab and shear head column system was an innovative architectural feature in Western Australia at the time.

In 2017 AGWA announced plans to redevelop its rooftop as focus for sculpture, events, restaurants, film, etc., in a project called "AGWA Elevate". This was scheduled to open before the gallery's anniversary in 2020. The state government pledged $10m towards this project. In the same year, "Six Seasons", a high-profile project to increase the focus on AGWA's Indigenous art, was initiated, with a new dedicated permanent Indigenous gallery inaugurated alongside "Plain Speak", a special exhibit for the Perth International Arts Festival.

Collections and exhibitions

The Aesthetic Movement inspired aspects of the Art Gallery's collection.

Ongoing exhibitions include Indigenous traditional and contemporary art from the Northern Territory and Western Australia, and Western Australian art from the 1820s to 1960s, alongside topical displays on key themes drawn from the collection.

Desert River Sea: Kimberley Art Then and Now is a major project begun around 2013, exploring Indigenous Australian art with funding support from Rio Tinto to the tune of A$1.8m. In 2019, Desert River Sea: Portraits of the Kimberley was mounted, a culmination of a six-year project between AGWA and Aboriginal artists and six art centres of the Kimberley. There is a separate website dedicated to the project.

Each year, AGWA exhibits work by talented graduating high school artists in its Year 12 Perspectives exhibition. In 2018, there were 55 works exhibited.

Awards

The Lester Prize
The Lester Prize, formerly the Black Swan Prize for Portraiture is one of Australia's richest portraiture prizes. Forty finalists are exhibited at AGWA during October and November each year. In 2007 Tina Wilson founded The Black Swan Prize and ARTrinsic Inc to manage it. In 2016 the award moved to AGWA, at which time Wilson stepped down from her role as patron. In April 2019, the prize was renamed The Lester Prize in recognition of the award's main patron, Richard (Dick) Lester . In 2022, 720 entries were submitted from across the country.

Gallery

References

External links

 
 Department of Culture and the Arts
 See the Gallery's bathroom at the Art Museum Toilet Museum of Art

Art museums and galleries in Western Australia
Museums in Perth, Western Australia
Culture of Western Australia
State Register of Heritage Places in the City of Perth
Art museums established in 1979
Statutory agencies of Western Australia
Perth Cultural Centre
Brutalist architecture in Australia